Professor Count Nikolay Alekseyevich Bobrinski (10 March 1890 – 27 December 1964) was a Russian zoologist and biogeographer.

Biography
Nikolay Alekseyevich Bobrinski was born on 10 March 1890 into the Russian aristocratic family Bobrinski, Bobrinsky or Bobrinskoy (Бобринские). In the 1930s he was held in high esteem within Russia and was working at the Zoological Museum in Moscow. His speciality was mammals and in 1944 he co-authored Mammals of the USSR. Other publications included The Animal World and Nature of the USSR and Animal Geography (1951).

Bobrinski's jerboa (Allactodipus bobrinskii), a species of small rodent,  and Bobrinski's serotine (Eptesicus bobrinskoi), a species of vesper bat, were named in his hon

Nikolay Alekseyevich Bobrinski died on 27 December 1964 at the age of 74.

References

Soviet zoologists
1890 births
1964 deaths